is a German Autobahn that connects the coast of the North Sea near Emden to the Ruhr area. It is also known as Emsland-Autobahn or East Frisian Skewer.

It was completed in December 2004. Construction was in part made possible by a unique method of financing: individuals, companies, towns, counties and the Netherlands donated money to accelerate the project.

Exit list

 

 

 

|}

External links 

31
A031
A031